

Galt F.C.
Coach: Louis Blake Duff
 Otto Christman (Midflield)
 George Ducker (Defender)
 John Fraser (Midfield)
 John Gourlay (captain)
 Alexander Hall (Forward)
 Albert Henderson (Forward)
 Albert Johnston (Midfield)
 Robert Lane (Midfield)
 Ernest Linton (Goalkeeper)
 Gordon McDonald (Forward)
 Frederick Steep (Forward)
 Tom Taylor (Forward)
 William Twaits (Forward)
 Parnell Gourlay (Forward)

Christian Brothers College
Player-coach: Joseph Lydon
 Charles Bartliff (Forward)
 Warren Brittingham (Forward)
 Oscar Brockmeyer (Defender)
 Alexander Cudmore (Forward)
 Charles January (Midfield)
 John January (Defender)
 Thomas January (Midfield)
 Raymond Lawler (Forward)
 Joseph Lydon (Forward)
 Louis Menges (goalkeeper)
 Peter Ratican(Midfield)

St. Rose Parish
* Joseph Brady (Midfield)
 George Cooke (Defender)
 Thomas Cooke (Defender)
 Cormic Cosgrove (Forward)
 Edward Dierkes (Midfield)
 Martin Dooling (Midfield)
 Frank Frost (goalkeeper)
 Claude Jameson (Forward)
 Henry Jameson (Defender)
 Johnson (Forward)
 Leo O'Connell (Forward)
 Harry Tate (Forward)

References
RSSSF
Galt FC 
IFFHS archive

1904 Summer Olympics
Football at the 1904 Summer Olympics